The Sumba jungle flycatcher (Eumyias stresemanni) is a passerine bird in the Old World flycatcher family Muscicapidae that is endemic to Sumba.

The Sumba jungle flycatcher was split as distinct species from the russet-backed jungle flycatcher (Eumyias oscillans) by the IOC in 2021.

References

Sumba jungle flycatcher
Birds of Sumba
Sumba jungle flycatcher